Unwan Chishti (5 February 1937 – 1 February 2004)  was an Urdu poet who gained repute as a poet, as a scholar, as a teacher and as a literary critic. He was the disciple of Abr Ahasani Gunnauri.

Life
Chishti  was born Iftikharul Hasan in Manglaur, Haridwar district, Uttarakhand. He was the son of Pirzadah Shah Anwarul Hasan Anwar Manglauri. He completed his early education in Manglaur and Muzaffarnagar. After his graduation he got his M.A. (geography, 1961), M.A. (Urdu, 1963), M.Lit. (1968), and Ph.D. (1973) degrees. He worked as a lecturer in Shoaib Mohammadia College in Agra before joining Jamia Millia Islamia on 15 September 1964. He taught Urdu and rose to be the Head of Urdu Department, Jamia Millia Islamia University, Delhi; he retired in 1997 as Dean of the Faculty of Humanities and Languages.

Literary career

He was an Urdu poet, a critic and an historian of Urdu literature, and has many books to his credit. He was the disciple of Abr Ahasani Gunnauri.

His literary career started in 1950 with the composition of his first ghazal. He learned the art of writing Urdu poems from his father and Nikahat Ali Adab Siddiqi.

A comprehensive appraisal on the works of Unwan Chishti conducted by Sughra  Alam was published in 2003 titled – . Earlier, dealing with his life and works, had been published in 1995.

Bibliography

Books by Unwan Chishti:

1) Urdu poetry:
 
 
 

2) Books (of research and criticism) by Unwan Chishti:

 Manaviyyat ki talaash
 Aruzi aur fanni masail
 Urdu shairi men haiat ke tajurbe
 Tanqidi pairae
 Tanqid se tahqiq tak
 Tanqid namah
 Makatib e Ahsan, ma’muqqaddamah va havashi
 Urdu shaeri mein jadeeddiyat ki rawayat
 Azadi ke bad Delhi mein urdu ghazal
 Chand chakor aur chandani
 Urdu mein classiki tanqid
 Islah nama
 Harf e barhana
 Manzoom tarjume ka amal
 Nazim e jadeed ki falsafiyana asas
 Minar e sadaa
 Urdu mein classiki tanqid
 Krishan Chander: Hayat o Khidmat

References

1937 births
2004 deaths
Urdu-language poets from India
Muslim poets
20th-century Indian Muslims
Poets from Uttarakhand
People from Haridwar district
20th-century Indian poets
Indian male poets
20th-century Indian male writers
Chishtis